Nick Duffy is an Australian rugby union player who plays for the  in the Super Rugby competition.  His position of choice is scrum-half.

References 

Australian rugby union players
Living people
Year of birth missing (living people)
Rugby union scrum-halves